Bat Yam Seafront, or Bat Yam Beachfront, runs along the Mediterranean seashore of the city of Bat Yam, Israel. The 3.5km coastal strip adjoins the Tel Aviv Promenade to the north, and is mostly used for leisure and recreational activities and open to the general public, mainly as bathing beaches, a boardwalk and parks.

Bat Yam Beaches
In July 2017 Bat Yam's beaches were named amongst Israel's most beautiful beaches by Ynet. The beaches include:

 Sea Palace
 Surfers Beach
 Jerusalem Beach
 The Three Rocky Shores
 Le-Dugma Beach
 The Riviera
 Marina beach
 Palm Beach
 Shirat Hayam (gender separated bathing)
 Thai Beach
 Al Gal

In history

 In March 1937, during the Arab revolt in Palestine, two people were killed on Bat Yam beach in an Irgun operation.
 On August 7, 1943, Lehi paramilitary member Eliyahu Giladi is thought to have been buried on the Bat Yam Seafront after he was executed by his fellow members.

The future
In September 2020, Globes reported that the Municipality of Bat Yam had applied for planning permission to build a new marina for luxury yachts.

External links

References

Beaches of Israel
Bat Yam